Oregon School District is located south of Madison, in the village of Oregon, Wisconsin. A publicly elected school board provides direction and oversight, with a superintendent heading the organization's administration for over 3,600 students and 6 schools.

Administration
 Superintendent:  Leslie Bergstrom

School Board 

 President:  Krista Flanagan
 Vice President:  Tim LeBrun
 Treasurer:  Troy Pankratz
 Clerk:  Ahna Bizjak

Schools

Elementary schools (K-4)
 Brooklyn (located south of Oregon in Village of Brooklyn)
 Forest Edge (K-6; located in the City of Fitchburg)
 Netherwood Knoll
 Prairie View

Intermediate school (5-6)
 Rome Corners

Middle school (7-8)
 Oregon Middle School

High school (9-12)
 Oregon High School

Expansion 
The Oregon School district is projected to grow by 2,000 students by 2030, a nearly 50% increase of the current enrollment. To deal with this expected surge, the school district built a new K-6 elementary school in 2018 and has plans to pass a referendum for a second middle school in 2024.

References

External links 
Oregon, Wisconsin area School District
Board Members
Expansion

School districts in Wisconsin
Education in Dane County, Wisconsin